Newton is a town that is located within the Central Area of the Central Region of Singapore. The planning area is bounded by the following planning areas - Orchard and Museum to the south, Tanglin to the west, Novena to the north, Kallang to the northeast and Rochor to the east.

Newton's namesake Newton Road, however, is located within Novena Planning Area, and starts at Newton Circus in the south and ends at the junction with Thomson Road in the north.

Occupying an area north of the renowned Orchard Road shopping belt, the territory of Newton Planning Area includes the grounds of The Istana, the official residence and office of the President of Singapore.

Etymology and history
Originally Syed Ali Road, Newton Road was renamed in 1914 after Alfred Howard Vincent Newton (died 1897), the Assistant Municipal Engineer in late nineteenth century Singapore in order to avoid confusion with Syed Alwi Road.

As eight roads converge on the Circus, the Tamils used to call Newton ethumuchandi, or "the eight junction place".

Newton Circus has become the site of a major hawker centre, Newton Food Centre.

See also
Newton MRT station

References

Victor R Savage, Brenda S A Yeoh (2003), Toponymics - A Study of Singapore Street Names, Eastern Universities Press, 

 
Places in Singapore
Novena, Singapore